Charles de Graft-Dickson (1913–1997) was a Ghanaian educationist and a politician. He served as a minister of State and a member of parliament in the first republic. Prior to politics, he was the chairman of Asante Kotoko S.C.

Early life and education
Charles de Graft-Dickson was born on 14 November 1913 to Charles Hebert Dickson at Konongo Odumase in the Ashanti Region.
His early education begun at St. Peter's Primary School in Kumasi he later proceeded to Prince of Wales College now Achimota School where he obtained his secondary education.

Career and politics
Charles begun teaching at St. Mary's School at Konongo from 1934 to 1937. He spent the next six years working at the Konongo mines. He later joined C. F. A. O. and became its employee president in 1944. In 1949 he was appointed chairman of Asante Kotoko S.C. and served in that capacity until 1953. He was a member of a two-man delegation sent to Puerto Rico for the inaugural ceremony of President Luis Muñoz Marín. On 23 July 1956 he was appointed ministerial secretary (deputy minister) to the Ministry of Education. In 1957 he was elevated to the post of Regional Commissioner (Regional Minister) of the Ashanti Region. In 1960 he was appointed Minister for Defence. He served in this position until 1961.

Personal life
His hobbies included gardening and motoring. He died on 19 November 1997.

References

1913 births
1997 deaths
Place of death unknown
Ghanaian MPs 1956–1965
Education ministers of Ghana
Defence ministers of Ghana
Convention People's Party (Ghana) politicians
20th-century Ghanaian politicians
Alumni of Achimota School